Juan Roberto Agosto Gonzalez (born February 23, 1958) is a Puerto Rican former relief pitcher who played for the Chicago White Sox, Minnesota Twins, Houston Astros, St. Louis Cardinals and the Seattle Mariners of Major League Baseball (MLB). In 13 seasons, Agosto had 40 wins, 33 losses, and a 4.01 earned run average (ERA).

Professional career
On January 18,  he was signed by the Chicago White Sox. He debuted with the White Sox on September 7, 1981, a loss to the Seattle Mariners. Agosto entered the game in the top of the 2nd inning, relieving Richard Dotson after Dotson gave up five runs in the inning. He was with the White Sox when they won the  American League West, and briefly pitched for them in the ALCS.

In six seasons with the White Sox, he went 8–8 with a 3.87 ERA in 154 games." In 1985, Agosto represented Puerto Rico in the Caribbean Series. The White Sox avoided arbitration with him that preseason by signing him to a one-year extension. Agosto was traded to the Minnesota Twins for Pete Filson in June 1986 and assigned to Minnesota's minor league affiliate in Toledo.

He signed with the Houston Astros for the 1987 season. In 1988, Agosto led the major leagues with a ten-game winning streak, the longest in Astros history at the time. In his four seasons with the Astros, Agosto pitched in 261 games.

After the 1990 season, Agosto became a free agent and signed a three-year contract with the St. Louis Cardinals The Cardinals released him in 1992 and the Seattle Mariners signed him in June of that year. Seattle sent Agosto to the minor leagues in August 1992. He was recalled to the team in September.

Before the 1996 season, the California Angels waived Agosto. He attempted to earn a bullpen slot with the Kansas City Royals in 1997, but he was cut during spring training after posting a 7.11 ERA.

Agosto threw a sinker, a curveball, and a screwball.

He and his first wife have one daughter.

See also
 Houston Astros award winners and league leaders
 List of Major League Baseball players from Puerto Rico

References

External links

1958 births
Living people
Appleton Foxes players
Buffalo Bisons (minor league) players
Calgary Cannons players
Chicago White Sox players
Denver Bears players
Edmonton Trappers players
Elmira Pioneers players
Glens Falls White Sox players
Houston Astros players
Las Vegas Stars (baseball) players
Major League Baseball pitchers
Major League Baseball players from Puerto Rico
Minnesota Twins players
Puerto Rican expatriate baseball players in Canada
Puerto Rico Boricuas players
Screwball pitchers
Seattle Mariners players
Sportspeople from San Juan, Puerto Rico
St. Louis Cardinals players
Toledo Mud Hens players
Tucson Toros players
Winter Haven Red Sox players
Winston-Salem Red Sox players